Cephetola mengoensis is a butterfly in the family Lycaenidae. It is found in Uganda and Kenya.

Subspecies
Cephetola mengoensis mengoensis (Uganda)
Cephetola mengoensis kenya Libert & Collins, 1999 (Kenya: Kakamega Forest)

References

External links
Die Gross-Schmetterlinge der Erde 13: Die Afrikanischen Tagfalter. Plate XIII 65 a

Butterflies described in 1906
Poritiinae